Elections to Newcastle-under-Lyme Borough Council were held on 7 May 1998.  One third of the council stood for election, and the Labour party kept control of the council.  After the election, the composition of the council was
Labour 42
Liberal Democrat 9
Conservative 5

Election result

References
"Council poll results", The Guardian 9 May 1998 page 16

1998
1998 English local elections
1990s in Staffordshire